The Campeonato Brasiliense Second Division is the second tier of football league of the state of Distrito Federal, Brazil.

List of champions

Names change
Esportivo Guará changed their name to Botafogo, in honor of Botafogo FR.
Comercial Bandeirante changed their name to CA Bandeirante, and then to CA Taguatinga. In 2018, CA Taguatinga merged with Taguatinga EC.
Dom Pedro II is the currently Real Brasília.
Unaí Itapuã is the currently Unaí EC.

Titles by team
Teams in bold stills active.

See also
Campeonato Brasiliense
Campeonato Brasiliense Third Division

References

External links
 Football Association of Federal District official website

 
Brasiliense